Colleen Natalie Falloon (née McMaster; born 10 July 1943) is a former New Zealand netball player. She played 11 international matches for the New Zealand team between 1960 and 1963, including at the 1963 World Netball Championships. More recently she has been active in Masters athletics, winning multiple national marathon titles, in the W60, W65, W70 and W75 categories.

Early life
Falloon was born Colleen Natalie McMaster on 10 July 1943. She was educated at Christchurch West High School, and went on to study at Christchurch Teachers' College.

Netball career
McMaster began playing representative netball for Canterbury in 1959, and was described as "one of the outstanding players" at that year's national netball championships, where she gained South Island honours.

In 1960, McMaster was selected for the New Zealand team that toured Australia, and was the youngest member of the touring party. She played in 12 of the 16 games on tour, mostly at goal attack, including in two of the three Test matches. McMaster was omitted from the second Test team, with Betty Steffensen being preferred at goal attack. The game was won by Australia, 44–39, and McMaster returned for the third Test, won 46–45 by Australia.

McMaster was a member of the New Zealand team at the inaugural World Netball Championships at Eastbourne, England, in 1963. At the tournament, New Zealand recorded nine wins and one loss, 36–37 against Australia, to finish as runners-up. In the game against , won by New Zealand 56–29, McMaster played at goal shooter and was reported as "working accurately and in perfect unison" with goal attack Judy Blair.

Across her international career, McMaster played in 11 Test matches.

Later life
McMaster was a schoolteacher. In 1971, she married Neil Francis Falloon, a mechanical engineer, and the couple went on to have two children. They lived at Muriwai, where Neil Falloon was active in surf lifesaving, as a competitor who won national titles, a referee, and manager of representative teams. He served as district president and district president for Surf Life Saving Northern Region, and was president of the Muriwai Surf Life Saving Club at the time of his death on 7 March 2006.

Colleen Falloon took up distance running, and by 2012 had run 82 marathons. She was second in the W60 category of the New Zealand national marathon championships in 2004, and won the event in 2006 and 2008. In 2013, she won the W65 category, and in 2014 and 2015 she finished second in the W70 division. She then won the W70 national marathon title in 2016, 2017 and 2018. In 2021, she won the W75 national marathon championship.

References

1943 births
Living people
People educated at Christchurch West High School
Netball players from Christchurch
New Zealand international netball players
New Zealand netball players
New Zealand masters athletes
New Zealand female marathon runners
1963 World Netball Championships players